Doliana is a community of the municipality North Kynouria, in eastern Arcadia, Greece. It consists of the villages Kato Doliana, Ano Doliana, Dragouni, Kouvlis, Prosilia and Rouneika. The population of the community is 846 (2011 census). The largest village of the community is Kato Doliana with 595 inhabitants. It serves as the winter residence of the population of Ano Doliana. It is considered a traditional settlement.

Olive oil production is the main source of income for the inhabitants.

Geography
The village is situated on the left bank of the river Tanos, on the south slopes of mountain Zavitsa. It is surrounded by an extensive olive trees plantation. The natural caves that have formed due to the erosion of the terrain caused by the flow of the river are of particular interest. They divide the settlement into two neighborhoods. The upper neighborhood is called Palamidi.

Attractions
The ancient Villa of Herodes Atticus at Eva is the most notable landmark. One can also visit the ancient settlements of Kourmeki and Tsiorovos and the women's Byzantine Monastery of Loukou.

Demographic evolution

People
 James Pantemis, Canadian professional goalkeeper of Greek descent, from his grandmother's side.

See also

 Ano Doliana, the mountainous residency of the settlers
 List of settlements in Arcadia
 List of traditional settlements of Greece

References

External links
 Cultural Association of Dolianites in Athens (in Greek)
 Doliana (in Greek)

Populated places in Arcadia, Peloponnese